Kim Trainor is a Canadian poet. Trainor was the recipient of the Fiddlehead's 2019 Ralph Gustafson Prize and the Malahat Review's 2013 Long Poem Prize.

Trainor's work is particularly concerned with grief and memory. Her first book Karyotype was published by Brick Books in 2015. George Elliot Clarke described the book as a "recollection of the organized violence that is war and/or tyranny" and noted that the book's focus on remembrance placed her in the lineage of World War One poet John McCrae. Trainor's second book Ledi was published by Book*hug. Focusing on the controversial excavation of the Siberian Ice Maiden, the book continues the poet's elegiac themes, with a focus on the Iron Age horsewoman's role in society. The book was a finalist for the 2019 Raymond Souster Award presented by the League of Canadian Poets. Her most recent work has focused on ecological grief and resilience. A thin fire runs through me will appear with icehouse poetry (Gooselane Editions) in 2023. A blueprint for survival will appear with Guernica Editions in Spring 2024.

Bibliography 
 Trainor, Kim. A blueprint for survival (2024) Guernica Editions 2024
 Trainor, Kim. A thin fire runs through me (2023) icehouse poetry / Goose Lane Editions 2023
 Trainor, Kim. Ledi (2018) Book*hug
 Trainor, Kim. Karyotype (2015) Brick Books
 Trainor, Kim. “Seed 1: Shelter,” “Paper Birch,” and “North Road.” Anthologized in Fire Season II, Fall 2022 
 Trainor, Kim. “Seed 11: Pacific Salmon (Oncorhynchus).” Dark Mountain, Issue 21, Spring 2022.
 Trainor, Kim. “Trickster, Scavenger, Discoverer of Light: Seed 12, Common Raven; Seed 13, Silene Steonphylla, Svalbard Seedvault; Seed 14: XR/Getting Deeper.” The Journal of Wild Culture. Spring 2022.
 Trainor, Kim. “An Excerpt from “Seeds”: “Seed 8, Elysia chlorotica” and “Seed 19, Gaia”. Ecozon@. Vol. 12, No.2. Eco-Georgic: From Antiquity to Anthropocene. 28 October 2021.
 Trainor, Kim. “Desolation.” Deep Wild Journal: Writing From the Backcountry. (US). Issue 3. June 2021.
 Trainor, Kim. Excerpt from “Seeds:” “Seed 5. Tiny house, caracol, snail + Seed 19. SARS-CoV-2.”  Ecocene: Cappadocia Journal of Environmental Humanities. (Turkey). Volume 1, Issue 2. Winter 2020.
 Trainor, Kim. “Pacific Tree Frog” and “Tonquin.”Fall/Winter 2020.  The Cold Mountain Review. (US). Special Issue on the Undiscovered.
 Trainor, Kim. “Snowdrop (Galanthus nivalis).” ISLE: Interdisciplinary Studies in Literature and Environment. (US). 24 November 2020. https://doi.org/10.1093/isle/isaa135
 Trainor, Kim. “Say Nuth Khaw Yum.” Ecological Citizen. October 2020. Vol.4, No.1, 2020.
 Trainor, Kim. “Pacific Tree Frog” and “Tonquin.”Fall/Winter 2020.  The Cold Mountain Review. (US). Special Issue on the Undiscovered.

References

Year of birth missing (living people)
Living people
21st-century Canadian poets
21st-century Canadian women writers
Canadian women poets